Netaji is a 2019 Indian cinema made in Irula language directed by Vijeesh Mani for producer Johny Kuruvila. The film stars Gokulam Gopalan in his first title role along with Master Alok and others. The film has M. J. Radhakrishnan as cinematographer and Harikumar Madhavan Nair as sound designer. The film was shot at Attappadi.

Netaji is officially India's first Irula language film, and the film won Guinness award for the first tribal language film. The film was also selected in the Indian Panorama section of IFFI Goa, 2019 as well as Bengaluru International Film Festival 2020.

Summary
Netaji is the story of Virat (Master Alok) and his Grandfather Netaji Gopalakrishnan, who was with Subhas Chandra Bose's Indian National Army. Virat, a city based kid comes to stay with his Grandfather, now staying with Irula tribe.

Cast
Gokulam Gopalan - Netaji Gopalakrishnan
Master Alok - Virat
Roji P. Kurian - Roji
RajeshB - Maari
Ashly Boban - Sarayu
Baby Siyamol - Valli
Issac Pattanipparambil - Gandhiyan Kumaran
Prasannan Pillai - IB Officer
Felix Kuruvila - Rahul
Murali Mattummal - Vaidhyar
Aakash Boban - Aakash
Sharafudeen - Siddharth
Asmin - Meena

Soundtrack
The music was composed by Jubair Muhammed and the lyrics were written by Dr. Prashanth Krishna.
Namath Naadu Solai Naadu... - Jubair Mohammed (Singer)
Va......Vayi.....Ya...Vai aggae.. - Adv. Gayathri R Nair (Singer)
Swaelae...... Swaelae... - Varsha Renjith (Singer)

Accolades

References

External links
 

2019 films
Irula-language films
Indian drama films
2019 drama films